is a pond in Gifu, Gifu Prefecture, Japan. It is located at the southern base of Mount Dodo, the city's tallest mountain. The area around the lake is known as the Hagi Falls Nature Park (萩の滝自然公園 Hagi-no-taki Shizen Kōen). The park is very popular in the fall when the leaves are changing color.

History
In 1966, the architects of the gasshō-zukuri houses in Shirakawa in the northern part of the prefecture were brought to Matsuo Pond to construct the Iwafune-sō (岩舟荘).

References

External links

Gifu
Tourist attractions in Gifu Prefecture
Landforms of Gifu Prefecture
Bodies of water of Japan
Ponds of Japan